Alex Scott (18 September 1929 – 25 June 2015) was an Australian-British television actor best known for his appearances in British television productions of the 1960s, including  Special Branch, The Avengers, Danger Man, The Saint and the final episode ("The Smile Behind the Veil", 1969) of Randall and Hopkirk (Deceased). He also appeared as Klaus in The Adventures of William Tell, episode 22 "The Killer" (1959).

Scott had roles in such films as Darling (1965), Fahrenheit 451 (1966), The Blue Max (1966), The Abominable Dr. Phibes (1971), Twins of Evil (1971) and The Asphyx (1972), and had been directed by Sir Laurence Olivier (The Shifting Heart), François Truffaut, John Sumner (Godsend) and John Schlesinger, among others.

Film career

He made over 60 appearances on British TV between 1955 and the 1990s but moved back to Australia in 1981. Since his return to Australia he had roles in the films Next of Kin (1982), Now and Forever (1983), Sky Pirates (1986) and Romper Stomper (1992). He was a founding member of the Melbourne Theatre Company and worked in theatre, television and film after his return. He played opposite Zoe Caldwell, another founding member and four-time Tony Award winning actor, in the Melbourne Theatre Company's The Visit in 2003 as a part of the 50th-anniversary season of the company. He also appeared in A Number, a play by Caryl Churchill and directed by Frank Howson, in 2006.

Personal life
Scott grew up in Ballarat, Victoria, and was educated at St Patrick's College, Ballarat; Xavier College in Melbourne; and the University of Melbourne. He lived in Toorak, Victoria, and had two sons, Rainer and Daniel, from his first marriage
His wife was Barbara Ady-Potger, cousin of the Seekers band member Keith Potger, AO. He has a step daughter named Rebecca.
Scott died peacefully at his home in Toorak on 25 June 2015.

Filmography

References

External links

Notice of death of Alex Scott, mtc.com.au; accessed 31 July 2015.

1929 births
2015 deaths
Date of death unknown
Australian male television actors
British male television actors
Australian male stage actors
British male stage actors
Australian male film actors
British male film actors
Male actors from Victoria (Australia)
People from Ballarat